The New Cambridge History of India is a major multi-volume work of historical scholarship published by Cambridge University Press. It replaced The Cambridge History of India published between 1922 and 1937.

The new history is being published as a series of individual works by single authors and, unlike the original, does not form a connected narrative. Also unlike the original, it only covers the period since the fourteenth century. The whole has been planned over four parts:
Pt. I The Mughals and their Contemporaries.
Pt. II Indian States and the Transition to Colonialism.
Pt. III The Indian Empire and the beginnings of Modern Society.
Pt. IV The Evolution of Contemporary South Asia.

Titles

The Mughals and their Contemporaries

Indian States and the Transition to Colonialism

The Indian Empire and the Beginnings of Modern Society

 Second edition:

The Evolution of Contemporary South Asia

See also
Murty Classical Library of India
The History of India, as Told by Its Own Historians

References

History books about India
Historiography of the British Empire
Cambridge University Press books
Series of history books